Françoise Enguehard (born 1957) a French-speaking author from Saint-Pierre-et-Miquelon who now resides in Canada. She and her husband have been involved in promoting the history and education about Acadian people, through the development of schools. She speaks throughout the French-speaking countries to promote French culture. She received the rank of Knight in the Order of La Pléiade in 2011 and was honored as a knight in the Legion of Honour, France's highest award, in 2015 for her commitment to preserving the heritage of Acadians and Saint-Pierre-et-Miquelon.

Early life
Françoise Reux was born in 1957 in the French Overseas collectivity of Saint-Pierre-et-Miquelon to Alice and Jean Reux. After studying French literature, in 1970, she moved to St. John's on the nearby island of Newfoundland, in Canada and soon married René Enguehard, also from Saint Pierre.

Enguehard and her husband were involved in founding several French schools, as well as a French School Board, to manage the French-language educational facilities in Newfoundland and Labrador. Enguehard joined the Télévision de Radio-Canada Atlantique, becoming their first journalist in Newfoundland in 1992. During her time with CBC, Enguehard began publishing novels. Her first book published in 1999 was Les litanies de l'Île-aux-Chiens, was reprinted in 2001 and released in English.

Enguehard left CBC in 2001 and founded a communications company Vivat. In addition to continuing her writing, publishing two juvenile novels Le trésor d'Elvis Bozec (2001) and Le pilote du Roy (2007), Enguehard speaks at various conferences and festivals promoting education on French language, culture and the history of the Acadians.

In 2015, her commitment to preserving the heritage of Acadians and Saint-Pierre-et-Miquelon was recognized with France's highest award, when she was honored as a knight in the Legion of Honour. She is currently the president of the National Acadian Foundation. In 2018, she moderated the NL NDP leadership debate.

Selected works
 1999 Les litanies de l'Île-aux-Chiens
 2001 Le trésor d'Elvis Bozec
 2007 Le pilote du Roy
 2010 L'archipel du docteur Thomas

References

Citations

Bibliography

 
 
 
 
 
 
 
 
 
 

1957 births
Living people
Canadian women journalists
Franco-Newfoundlander people
French emigrants to Canada
Journalists from Newfoundland and Labrador
People from Saint Pierre and Miquelon
Writers from St. John's, Newfoundland and Labrador
20th-century Canadian journalists
21st-century Canadian journalists
20th-century Canadian women writers
21st-century Canadian women writers
20th-century French women writers
21st-century French women writers